"LA Confidential" is a song by Canadian rapper Tory Lanez. The song was released on January 29, 2016 by Mad Love Records and Interscope Records. The song is produced by Benny Blanco, Cashmere Cat, Pop and Toro.

Critical reception
"LA Confidential" received positive reviews from music critics. Rap-Up wrote, "the Toronto singer-rapper keeps it real with his girl on the rock-edged jam, singing about remaining faithful in a relationship". Paul Thompson of XXL opined that the song "invokes a town with an entirely different cache" and "is exactly the kind of slinking cut that Lanez would hope to leverage into mainstream success in 2016".

Music video
On March 30, 2016, a 15-second teaser of the music video was released. The video premiered on MTV on April 1, 2016, and was uploaded on Lanez's VEVO channel on the same day.

Charts

Weekly charts

Certifications

References

External links

2016 singles
2016 songs
Interscope Records singles
Song recordings produced by Benny Blanco
Songs written by Miguel (singer)
Virgin Records singles
EMI Records singles
Tory Lanez songs
Songs written by Benny Blanco
Songs written by Cashmere Cat
Songs written by Pop Wansel
Song recordings produced by Cashmere Cat
Songs written by Tory Lanez